, known as Everybody's Golf 2 in the PAL region (Australian version titled Everybody's Golf: Open Tee 2) and Hot Shots Golf: Open Tee 2 in North America, is the eighth game in the Everybody's Golf series and the second to be released for PlayStation Portable. The game featured an online mode where up to 16 players were able to play on a single course. The servers shut down on 5 December 2011, making it impossible to play online since then.

Reception

The game received "favourable" reviews according to the review aggregation website Metacritic. Eurogamer called it an unfussy feel-good game. IGN said: "Open Tee 2 delivers a solid, easy-to-use golf engine that gets mixed with wacky characters and costumes". In Japan, Famitsu gave it a score of 37 out of 40.

References

External links
 PlayStation EU game page
 

2007 video games
Golf video games
PlayStation Portable games
PlayStation Portable-only games
Sony Interactive Entertainment games
Everybody's Golf
Video games developed in Japan